The Bayer designation Pi Ursae Majoris (π UMa, π Ursae Majoris) is shared by two stars in the constellation Ursa Major:

 Pi¹ Ursae Majoris (3 Ursae Majoris)
 Pi² Ursae Majoris (4 Ursae Majoris)

They are separated by 0.70° in the sky.  They are sometimes given the name Muscida, which can also refer to ο Ursae Majoris.

The two stars, Pi¹ and Pi² together, are considered an optical double star. They are not a binary star, in that they are not gravitationally linked, but they are close to each other as seen in the sky, and so are optically associated.

Ursae Majoris, Pi
Ursa Major (constellation)
Muscida